Fellowship of the Academy of Medical Sciences (FMedSci)  is an award for medical scientists who are judged by the UK Academy of Medical Sciences for the "excellence of their science, their contribution to medicine and society and the range of their achievements".

Fellowship
Fellows are entitled to use the post-nominal letters FMedSci; see :Category:Fellows of the Academy of Medical Sciences (United Kingdom) for examples of fellows.

References

Fellows of learned societies of the United Kingdom
Academy of Medical Sciences (United Kingdom)